Aliaksei Kishou (born 23 September 1986) is a Belarusian handball player for SKA Minsk and the Belarusian national team.

References

External links

1986 births
Living people
Belarusian male handball players
People from Slutsk
Expatriate handball players
Belarusian expatriate sportspeople in Russia
Sportspeople from Minsk Region